This is a list of Carnegie libraries.

List of Carnegie libraries in the United States
List of Carnegie libraries in Canada
List of Carnegie libraries in Europe
List of Carnegie libraries in Africa
List of Carnegie libraries in the Caribbean
List of Carnegie libraries in Oceania